The  ('without breeches') were the common people of the lower classes in late 18th-century France, a great many of whom became radical and militant partisans of the French Revolution in response to their poor quality of life under the . The word , which is opposed to "aristocrat", seems to have been used for the first time on 28 February 1791 by Jean-Bernard Gauthier de Murnan in a derogatory sense, speaking about a " army". The word came into vogue during the demonstration of 20 June 1792.

The name  refers to their clothing, and through that to their lower-class status:  were the fashionable silk knee-breeches of the 18th-century nobility and bourgeoisie, and the working class  wore pantaloons, or long trousers, instead. The , most of them urban labourers, served as the driving popular force behind the revolution. They were judged by the other revolutionaries as "radicals" because they advocated a direct democracy, that is to say, without intermediaries such as members of parliament. Though ill-clad and ill-equipped, with little or no support from the middle and upper classes, they made up the bulk of the Revolutionary army and were responsible for many executions during the early years of the French Revolutionary Wars.

Political ideals

They supported the abolition of all the authority and privileges of the monarchy, nobility, and Roman Catholic clergy, the establishment of fixed wages, the implementation of price controls to ensure affordable food and other essentials, and vigilance against counter-revolutionaries.

They expressed their demands through petitions of the sections presented to the assemblies (the Legislative, and Convention) by the delegates. The  had a third way of applying pressure to achieve their demands: the police and the courts received thousands of denunciations of traitors and supposed conspirators. The height of their influence spanned roughly from the original overthrow of the monarchy in 1792 to the Thermidorian Reaction in 1794. Throughout the revolution, the  provided the principal support behind the more radical and anti-bourgeoisie factions of the Paris Commune, such as the Enragés and the Hébertists, and were led by populist revolutionaries such as Jacques Roux and Jacques Hébert.

The  also populated the ranks of paramilitary forces charged with physically enforcing the policies and legislation of the revolutionary government, a task that commonly included violence and the carrying out of executions against perceived enemies of the revolution.

But by early 1794, as the bourgeois and middle-class elements of the revolution began to gain more political influence, the fervent working-class radicalism of the  rapidly began falling out of favour within the National Convention. After the defeat of the 1795 popular revolt in Paris, the  ceased to play any effective political role in France until the July Revolution of 1830.

Appearance

The distinctive costume of typical  featured:
  (a type of wooden clog), and
 the red Phrygian cap, also known as a "liberty cap"

Events

On 27 April 1791, Robespierre opposed plans to reorganize the National Guard and restrict its membership to active citizens, largely property owners. He demanded the reconstitution of the army on a democratic basis to allow passive citizens. He felt that the army had to become the instrument of defence of the Revolution and no longer be a threat to it. On 28 April, despite Robespierre's intensive campaign, the principle of an armed bourgeois militia was definitively enacted in the Assembly.

Along with other Jacobins, he urged in his magazine the creation of a revolutionary army in Paris, consisting of 20,000 men, with the goal to defend "liberty" (the revolution), maintain order in the sections, and educate the members in democratic principles; an idea he borrowed from Jean-Jacques Rousseau and Machiavelli. According to Jean Jaures, he considered this even more important than the right to strike.

Following the king's veto of the Assembly's efforts to raise a militia of volunteers, the reinstatement of Brissotin ministers and suppression of non-juring priests, the monarchy faced an abortive Demonstration of 20 June 1792. They invited the officials to join the procession and march along with them.

Early in the morning (10 August 1792) 30,000 Fédérés,  and  militants from the sections led a successful assault upon the Tuileries; according to Robespierre a triumph for the "passive" (non-voting) citizens.

In Spring 1793, after the defection of Dumouriez, Robespierre urged the creation of a " army" to sweep away any conspirator.

On 1 May the crowds threatened armed insurrection if the emergency measures demanded (price control) were not adopted. Every public square should be used to produce arms and pikes. On 18 May Marguerite-Élie Guadet proposed to examine the "exactions" and to replace municipal authorities.

On 28 May the Paris Commune accepted the creation of a  army to enforce revolutionary laws. Petitioners from the sections and the Commune appeared at the bar of the Convention at about five o'clock in the afternoon on 31 May. According to Hampson, the subject is quite extraordinarily complicated and obscure. The next day all Paris was in arms. 

On 2 June 1793, a large force of supposedly 80,000  and National Guards led by Hanriot, surrounded the convention with 160–172 guns.

On 4 September, the  again invaded the convention. They demanded tougher measures against rising prices and the setting up of a system of terror to root out the counter-revolution. The  took an especially active interest in the revolutionary army.

A " army" (in a sense, Robespierre's brain-child) was formed in Paris.

Barère voiced the Committee of Public Safety's support for the measures desired by the assembly: he presented a decree that was passed immediately, establishing a paid armed force of 6,000 men and 1,000 gunners "designed to crush the counter-revolutionaries, to execute wherever the need arises the revolutionary laws and the measures of public safety that are decreed by the National Convention, and to protect provisions (A force of citizen-soldiers which could go into the countryside to supervise the requisition of grain, to prevent the manoeuvres of rich  and deliver them up to the vengeance of the laws)".) For that reason, twelve travelling tribunals (with moveable guillotines) were set up.

Three months later, on 4 December the departmental  revolutionary armies (except in Paris) were banned on proposal of Tallien. The sections lost all rights to control their delegates and officials.

On 4 March 1794, there were rumours of uprising in the Cordeliers club. The Hébertists hoped that the National Convention would expel Robespierre and his Montagnard supporters. The  did not respond and Hanriot refused to cooperate. On 18 March Bourdon attacked the Commune and the  army. Jacques Hébert, Ronsin, Vincent, Momoro, Clootz, De Kock were arrested on charges of complicity with foreign powers (William Pitt the Younger) and guillotined on 24 March. On 27 March the infantry and cavalry of the revolutionary army, for eight months active in Paris and surroundings, was finally disbanded, except their artillery. (Hanriot was denounced by the Revolutionary Tribunal as an accomplice of Hébert, but seems to have been protected by Robespierre.)<ref>[https://romantic-circles.org/editions/robespierre/moniteur_comp.html The Morning Chronicle (18 August) and Gazette Nationale ou Le Moniteur Universel (29 July)]</ref>

Montagnard influence

The working class was especially hurt by a hail storm which damaged grain crops in 1788, which caused bread prices to skyrocket.
 
The faction known as the Montagnards expressed concern for the working classes of France. When the National Convention met to discuss the fate of the former king Louis XVI in 1792, the  vehemently opposed a proper trial, instead opting for an immediate execution. Louis XVI was executed on January 21, 1793.

The demands of the  did not stop with the execution of the King, and the Montagnards worked hard to fulfil their mounting orders. This increased pressure from the radical masses exacerbated the ideological split between the Montagnards and the Girondins, and tensions began to grow within the convention. Eventually, by May 1793, the Montagnards worked with the National Guard—which was, at this time, mostly —to depose many of the Girondin deputies. Jeremy Popkin writes, "[the Montagnards and the sans-culottes] surrounded the Convention, and two days later the intimidated assembly suspended twenty-nine Girondin deputies. The defeated Girondin leaders fled to the provinces. The Montagnards were left in control of the Convention, which itself was clearly at the mercy of whoever could command the armed  battalions." Otherwise, they would risk a similar uprising and their own exile, or possibly even execution. This political shift towards radicalism would soon turn into the Reign of Terror.

Reign of Terror

The mass violence of the  created a lasting impact during the Reign of Terror. These revolutionaries allied themselves most readily with those in power who promised radical change. The  believed in a complete upheaval of the government, pushing for the execution of any that were considered corrupt by the leaders, even going as far as wanting "the enemies of the republic [to] hang-main and the guillotine to stand like the first patriots, the finisher of the law." The support of the  could be used as a political weapon to get rid of enemies of the Revolution. The key to Robespierre's Terror lay in their willingness and ability to mobilize. Thus, the Committee leaders used speeches to gain their support. In a speech On the Principles of Political Morality. Robespierre proclaimed: "It has been said that terror was the mainspring of despotic government. Does your government, then, resemble a despotism? Yes, as the sword which glitters in the hands of liberty's heroes resembles the one with which tyranny's lackeys are armed." Robespierre expressed a desire for liberty that the  admired. They pushed the committee for radical changes and often found a voice with Robespierre. Their desperate desire for immediate changes and their aptitude for violence made the  a necessary group in implementing the Terror.

Legacy
The popular image of the  has gained currency as an enduring symbol for the passion, idealism and patriotism of the common man of the French Revolution. The term sans-culottism''',  in French, refers to this idealized image and the themes associated with it. Many public figures and revolutionaries who were not strictly working class styled themselves  in solidarity and recognition.

The French Republican Calendar at first termed the complementary days at the end of the year Sansculottides; however, the National Convention suppressed the name when adopting the Constitution of the Year III (1795) and substituted the name  ("additional days").

Analysis
According to Sally Waller, part of the  mantra was "permanent anticipation of betrayal and treachery".
He further notes they were organised notably in the local political clubs of Paris and "provided the main striking-force of the revolution". Hobsbawm writes that these were the actual demonstrators, rioters and constructors of the street barricades.

Indeed, as one historian points out, Soboul's concept has not been used by scholars in any other period of French history.

Modern colloquial usage

Ironically, given its origin as a term to describe men's breeches, the term "culottes" in more recent French describes women's underpants, an article of clothing that has little or no relation to the historical culottes, but now also refers to apparent skirts that are actually split with two legs.  The term  has been used colloquially to mean not wearing underpants.

See also
 Croppy
 Descamisado
 Enragés
 François Chabot 
 Hébertists
 Lazzaroni (Naples)
 Lumpenproletariat

References

Sources
 
 
 
 
 

Further reading

 Andrews, Richard Mowery. "Social Structures, Political Elites and Ideology in Revolutionary Paris, 1792–94: A Critical Evaluation of Albert Soboul's' Les sans-culottes parisiens en l'an II'," Journal of Social History (1985) 19#1 pp. 71–112. in JSTOR
 Furet, François and Mona Ozouf, eds. A Critical Dictionary of the French Revolution (1989), pp. 393–99
 Palmer, Robert Roswell (1958), Twelve Who Ruled. The Making of the Sans-culottes: Democratic Ideas and Institutions in Paris ...by R.B. Rose (1983)
 Salmon, Jean (1975), Curés Sans-culottes En Province : 1789-1814. Langres: Diffusion Museé Saint-Didier.  Sonenscher, Michael. Sans-Culottes: An Eighteenth-Century Emblem in the French Revolution (Princeton University Press, 2008). Pp. 493. 
 Williams, Gwyn A (1969), Artisans and Sans-culottes: Popular Movements in France and Britain during the French Revolution. Foundations of Modern History. New York: Norton. Woloch, Isser, and Peter McPhee. "A Revolution in Political Culture" in McPhee, ed., A Companion to the French Revolution'' (2012) pp. 435–453

Anti-Catholicism in France
Anti-monarchists
French radicals
Groups of the French Revolution
18th century in Paris
French Revolution
18th-century rebellions
18th-century revolutions
Republicanism in France
French First Republic